The Redeemer may refer to:

 The Redeemer, a 2002 comic mini-series by Warhammer Monthly
 The Redeemer (novel), a crime novel by Jo Nesbø
 The Redeemer a character in the Spawn comics
 The Redeemer: Son of Satan, an American horror film

See also 
 Redeemer (disambiguation)